The German Masters is a professional ranking snooker tournament held at the Tempodrom in Berlin, Germany since 2011. The 2021 event was held at Milton Keynes in England because of the COVID-19 pandemic. Ali Carter is the reigning champion, having won the event in 2023. An earlier ranking event, the German Open, was held in Germany from 1995 to 1997. This was followed by an invitation event, called the German Masters, in 1998.

History

The tournament started as the German Open and was a ranking tournament from 1995 to 1997. The first event was played in Frankfurt in December 1995, replacing the European Open in the December place in the calendar, the European Open being moved to early 1996. The tournament involved the top 16 players in the world ranking who were joined by 16 qualifiers and 4 wild-card players. The four lowest ranked qualifiers played the wild-card players, winning all their four matches and advancing to the last-32. John Higgins met Ken Doherty in the final. The match was level at three frame each before Higgins won the next six frames to win 9–3 and take the first prize of £40,000. Higgins made a break of 139 in the final to also win the high break prize of £5,000.

The 1996 event was again held in December, at the British military base at Osnabrück. Only 16 players competed in Germany. The final qualifying round in which the top-16 seeds played 16 players from earlier qualifying rounds was played in Preston, Lancashire in November. Ronnie O'Sullivan met Alain Robidoux in the final, winning 9–7. O'Sullivan led 7–3 before Robidoux won the next four frames to level the match at 7–7. O'Sullivan then won the next two frames to win the match, finishing with a break of 108. Robidoux took the high break prize for a break of 145 in the final.

The 1997 event was held in Bingen am Rhein using the same format as in 1996. The final qualifying round was held in Hereford in September. John Higgins met Ken Doherty in the final, Higgins led 5–3 lead after the first session and then won the first three frames in the evening session to lead 8–3. Parrott won frame 12 but Higgins finished the match with a break of 105 in the next frame, winning the first prize of £50,000. In 1998 the event was again held at Bingen am Rhein but became an invitation event with 12 players competing. The name of the tournament was changed to German Masters. The winner received £25,000 with all 12 players guaranteed a minimum of £5,000. John Parrott beat Mark Williams 6–4 in the final. Williams led 4–3 but Parrott won the next three to win the match. The event then was discontinued, but returned for the 2010/2011 season as a ranking tournament.

The revived tournament has been held at the Tempodrom in Berlin since the 2011 edition. It has traditionally been run as a five-day event (from Wednesday to Sunday) with the format being a flat-128 player draw and the first two rounds played as qualifiers away from the venue sometime before the main event. The format received occasional criticism over the years, but the 2023 German Masters received notable criticism as a result of many Top 16 players failing to reach the main stages of the tournament and Ronnie O'Sullivan withdrawing before his first round qualifying match. (initially there was just six players who qualified, but this dropped to four as two were suspended). In the main event itself, two of those players failed to progress beyond the Last 16.

Following those criticisms and with support of the promoter SnookerStars.de, the World Snooker Tour confirmed that the televised stages of the tournament were to be increased from its normal five days to the traditional seven days.

Winners

See also

Paul Hunter Classic
Sport in Berlin

References

 
Recurring sporting events established in 1995
1995 establishments in Germany
Snooker ranking tournaments
Snooker competitions in Germany